Robert Arthur Stern  (born February 1962) is a British philosopher who serves as professor of philosophy at the University of Sheffield. He is known for his work on the history of philosophy, particularly G. W. F. Hegel and Immanuel Kant. His current research is focused on the Danish ethicist Knud Ejler Løgstrup.

Education and career
Stern graduated from St John's College, Cambridge, and then became a research fellow there. He has been a professor at the University of Sheffield since 2000, and was the head of the Department of Philosophy from 2004 to 2008.

He is on the editorial board of the European Journal of Philosophy, and was president of the British Philosophical Association. He was elected a fellow of the British Academy in 2019.

Works

Books

Journal articles

References

External links
 Profile: Robert Stern University of Sheffield

1962 births
20th-century British philosophers
21st-century British philosophers
Academics of the University of Sheffield
Alumni of St John's College, Cambridge
Fellows of St John's College, Cambridge
British historians of philosophy
Hegelian philosophers
Living people